The Lac de Bonlieu (English: Lake of Bonlieu) is a lake in the Jura department, Bourgogne-Franche-Comté, France. It is named after the commune of Bonlieu.

Bonlieu
Natura 2000 in France